Teertha is a village in the southern state of Karnataka, India. It is located in the Kundgol taluk of Dharwad district.

Demographics 
As of the 2011 Census of India there were 168 households in Teertha and a total population of 784 consisting of 425 males and 359 females. There were 122 children ages 0-6.

References

Villages in Dharwad district